is the sixth compilation album by Japanese entertainer Miho Nakayama. Released through King Records on November 26, 1993, the album includes seven re-recordings of Nakayama's ballads, two new singles, and three cover songs. The initial release of the album featured a holographic image of gemstones swirling around Nakayama.

The album peaked at No. 9 on Oricon's albums chart. It sold over 89,000 copies and was certified Gold by the RIAJ.

Track listing

Charts

Certification

References

External links
 
 

1993 compilation albums
Miho Nakayama compilation albums
Japanese-language compilation albums
King Records (Japan) compilation albums